Abdichi-Moké Diarra (born 12 November 1983) is a Malian former professional footballer who played as a midfielder.

Career
Diarra was born in Bamako, Mali.

In May 2011, he trialled wth RC Strasbourg Alsace.

In 2012, Diarra joined German lower league side FC Sylt.

References

External links
 
 
 DZ Foot

Living people
1983 births
Sportspeople from Bamako
Malian emigrants to France
Association football midfielders
Malian footballers
Louhans-Cuiseaux FC players
FC Gueugnon players
Moulins Yzeure Foot players
USM Alger players
CA Bizertin players
SO Cassis Carnoux players
CS Duguwolofila players
Malian expatriate footballers
Malian expatriate sportspeople in Algeria
Expatriate footballers in Algeria
Malian expatriate sportspeople in Tunisia
Expatriate footballers in Tunisia
Malian expatriate sportspeople in Germany
Expatriate footballers in Germany